The Roman Catholic Diocese of Umtata is a diocese located in the city of Umtata, King Sabata Dalindyebo Local Municipality, in the Ecclesiastical province of Durban in South Africa.

History
 30 March 1930: Established as Apostolic Prefecture of Umtata from the Apostolic Vicariate of Mariannhill
 12 April 1937: Promoted as Apostolic Vicariate of Umtata
 11 January 1951: Promoted as Diocese of Umtata

Special churches
The Cathedral is the Cathedral of Our Lady Assumed into Heaven in Umtata.

Leadership
 Prefects Apostolic of Umtata (Roman rite)
 Fr. Daniele Kauczor, M.C.C.I. (1923 – 1926)
 Fr. Luigi Mohn, M.C.C.I. (1926.12.10 – 1930)
 Fr. Emanuele Hanisch, M.H.M. (1930.10.28 – 1937.04.13 see below)
 Vicars Apostolic of Umtata (Roman rite)
 Bishop Emanuele Hanisch, M.H.M. (see above 1937.04.13 – 1940.02.28)
 Bishop Joseph Grueter, C.M.M. (1941.04.03 – 1951.01.11 see below)
 Bishops of Umtata (Roman rite)
 Bishop Joseph Grueter, C.M.M. (see above 1951.01.11 – 1968.09.26)
 Bishop Ernst Heinrich Karlen, C.M.M. (1968.09.26 – 1974.05.09), appointed Bishop of Bulawayo, Zimbabwe; future Archishop
 Bishop Peter Fanyana John Butelezi, O.M.I. (1975.07.10 – 1978.04.27), appointed Archishop of Bloemfontein
 Bishop Andrew Zolile T. Brook (1979.02.12 – 1995.01.07)
 Bishop Oswald Georg Hirmer (1997.04.21 – 2008.02.08)
 Bishop Anton Sipuka (since 2008.02.08)

See also
Roman Catholicism in South Africa

Sources
 GCatholic.org
 Catholic Hierarchy

Umtata
Christian organizations established in 1930
Roman Catholic dioceses and prelatures established in the 20th century
Roman Catholic Ecclesiastical Province of Durban
 
King Sabata Dalindyebo Local Municipality